Discogobio is a genus of cyprinid fish that are found in eastern Asia. So far the 16 species have only been identified from China (11 species) and Vietnam (5 species) wherein each species is endemic to the country in which it is found.

Species
 Discogobio antethoracalis L. P. Zheng & W. Zhou, 2008
 Discogobio bismargaritus X. L. Chu, G. H. Cui & W. Zhou, 1993
 Discogobio brachyphysallidos S. Y. Huang, 1989
 Discogobio caobangi V. H. Nguyễn, 2001
 Discogobio dienbieni V. H. Nguyễn, 2001
 Discogobio elongatus S. Y. Huang, 1989
 Discogobio laticeps X. L. Chu, G. H. Cui & W. Zhou, 1993
 Discogobio longibarbatus H. W. Wu, 1977
 Discogobio macrophysallidos S. Y. Huang, 1989
 Discogobio microstoma (Đ. Y. Mai, 1978)
 Discogobio multilineatus G. H. Cui, W. Zhou & J. H. Lan, 1993
 Discogobio pacboensis V. H. Nguyễn, 2001
 Discogobio poneventralis L. P. Zheng & W. Zhou, 2008
 Discogobio propeanalis L. P. Zheng & W. Zhou, 2008
 Discogobio tetrabarbatus S. Y. Lin, 1931
 Discogobio yunnanensis (Regan, 1907)

References

 

 
Cyprinidae genera
Cyprinid fish of Asia